Aznagulovo (Aźnağol) is a rural locality (a village) in Tlyaumbetovsky Selsoviet, Kugarchinsky District, Bashkortostan, Russia. The population was 180 as of 2010. There is 1 street.

Geography 
Aznagulovo is located 45 km west of Mrakovo (the district's administrative centre) by road. Chernigovsky is the nearest rural locality.

References 

Rural localities in Kugarchinsky District